Chamobatidae is a family of mites belonging to the order Sarcoptiformes.

Genera:
 Ceratobates Balogh & Mahunka, 1969
 Chamobates Hull, 1916
 Globozetes Sellnick, 1928
 Hypozetes Balogh, 1959
 Iugoribates Sellnick, 1944
 Ocesobates Aoki, 1965
 Oesobates Aoki, 1965
 Pedunculozetes Hammer, 1962

References

Sarcoptiformes